There Is a Cloud is the sixth live album (tenth album overall) by American contemporary worship band Elevation Worship. The album was released on March 17, 2017 by Elevation Church, alongside Provident Label Group.

There Is a Cloud was nominated for a GMA Dove Award in the Worship Album of the Year and the Long Form Video of the Year categories at the 48th Annual GMA Dove Awards, and the Top Christian Album Award at the 2018 Billboard Music Awards.

Background
Elevation Worship recorded the album live during the 12-day "Code Orange Revival" event in September 2016, held by Elevation Church at its Ballantyne campus in Charlotte, North Carolina. In an interview with Herb Longs of The Christian Beat, Chris Brown and Mack Brock, founding members of Elevation Worship, were asked for insight into the title track "There Is a Cloud" and why the song represented the collection. Brown responded saying:
In 1 Kings there's a story about Elijah telling his servant to go look for a raincloud when the country had been in a drought for 3 years. And his servant comes back 6 times saying there's no sign of rain. But finally on the 7th time, he reports that he sees a small cloud rising out over the sea. And it felt like a great message to center our album around – that when we find ourselves in a season of drought, a season of waiting or of wondering when we'll see the harvest from what we've been sowing, we can trust that God is faithful, throughout it all! When God gives us a promise, it's no longer a matter of if, but when. A season of drought doesn't mean the death of a promise, only a delay. Cause what God promises, He'll always do. So this title track for the album is centered around the faithfulness of God.

 – Chris Brown, The Christian Beat

Promotion
The title track of the album, "There Is a Cloud", was released on January 13, 2017 as the first single, when the pre-order of the album began. "Do It Again" was released on February 17, 2017 during the pre-order period as the second single of the album.

Singles
"Do It Again" was released as the first single from the album, having impacted Christian radio on February 23, 2018.

Critical reception

At The Christian Beat, Chris Major rated the album three-point-six stars out of five, concluding that " Many of the tracks have beautiful moments that captivate and inspire listeners, but the oversaturated nature of the album makes it hard for those moments to truly resonate." Rating the album a perfect five stars in a NewReleaseToday review, John Hisel believes that "In There Is A Cloud, Elevation Worship has created one of the best worship releases in recent memory," and concludes that "There Is A Cloud is full of songs that have the potential to be sung anywhere and everywhere, while always keeping the focus on Jesus," and that the album "could prove to be very influential throughout the praise and worship movement."

Awards and accolades
On August 9, 2017, the Gospel Music Association was announced that There Is a Cloud would be nominated for a GMA Dove Award in the Worship Album of the Year and the Long Form Video of the Year categories at the 48th Annual GMA Dove Awards. On April 17, 2018, Billboard announced that the album was nominated for the Top Christian Album Award at the 2018 Billboard Music Awards.

Commercial performance
In the week ending March 23, 2017, 34,000 equivalent album units of There Is a Cloud were sold. The album rose to No. 1 on the Billboard Christian Albums chart and No. 11 on the Billboard 200 chart dated April 8, 2017.

Track listing

Charts

Weekly charts

Year-end charts

Release history

References

2017 live albums
Elevation Worship albums